Schinia nubila, the camphorweed flower moth or brown flower moth, is a moth of the family Noctuidae. The species was first described by Herman Strecker in 1876. It is found from the US states of Oklahoma to New Jersey, south to Florida and Texas. Its range is expanding in the northeast. Furthermore, recorded from Colorado, Kansas, Oklahoma, Arkansas, North Carolina, South Carolina and Maryland.

The wingspan is 22–24 mm. There is one generation per year.

Larvae have been recorded on Heterotheca subaxillaris and Solidago species.

References

"Schinia nubila". Moths of Maryland. Retrieved March 23, 2020.
Frost, S. W. (March 1975). "Third Supplement to Insects Taken in Light Traps at the Archbold Biological Station, Highlands County, Florida". The Florida Entomologist. 58 (1): 35–42. .
Species report

Schinia
Taxa named by Herman Strecker
Moths described in 1876
Moths of North America